This page lists notable alumni and former students, faculty, and administrators of California State University, Northridge.

Administrators
 Dick Enberg - sportscaster and college administrator
 S. K. Ramesh - electrical engineer and university administrator
 Ruth Simmons - current President of Prairie View A&M University, previously served as the 18th president of Brown University
 Thor Steingraber - opera and theater director, and arts administrator

Alumni

Academia
 Eric V. Anslyn – Distinguished Professor of Chemistry at the University of Texas at Austin
 Judy Baca – Professor of Chicana/o Studies and Professor of World Arts and Cultures at UCLA
 Betty Beaumont – conceptual artist who has served on the faculty of the University of California at Berkeley, The School of the Art Institute of Chicago, SUNY, Purchase, Hunter College, New York University, and Columbia University
 Michael Ferejohn – Professor of Philosophy at Duke University
 Lori Cox Han – Professor of Political Science at Chapman University
 Jack C. Hayya (1929-2018) – Professor of Management Science at the Pennsylvania State University
 Judith H. Hibbard – Senior Researcher and Professor at the University of Oregon
 Michael Klonsky - activist, Professor of Education at Loyola University Chicago
 David C. Lane – author, Professor of Philosophy and Sociology
 Ralph Larkin – sociologist, Assistant Professor of Sociology at Rutgers University, Newark and Adjunct Professor at John Jay College of Criminal Justice
 Minnette Gersh Lenier – teacher who used magic to improve students’ learning skills
 Kathleen Lowe Melde – Professor of Electrical Engineering and Associate Dean at the University of Arizona
 Peter W. Schramm – Professor of Political Science at Ashland University
 Alex Sevanian – Professor of Molecular Pharmacology and Toxicology at University of Southern California
 Chauntelle Tibbals – sociologist specialized in gender and sexualities
 Barbara Tilley – Professor of Biostatistics at Case Western Reserve University, the Medical University of South Carolina, and the UTHealth School of Public Health
 Robert H. Todd – Professor of Mechanical Engineering at Brigham Young University
 C. Richard Tracy – ecologist and Professor of Biology at University of Nevada, Reno
 Ann E. Watkins – Professor of Mathematics at California State University, Northridge
 Mark Watson – Professor of Economics and Public Affairs at Princeton University, previously at Harvard University and Northwestern University

Business

 Andrew Anagnost – President and CEO of Autodesk
 Vincent Barabba – market researcher and former head of the United States Census Bureau
 Gene Baur – President and co-founder of Farm Sanctuary
 Jim Berk – CEO of Participant Media (An Inconvenient Truth, Bridge of Spies, Green Book, Spotlight)
 Stephen Bollenbach (1960) – Co-Chairman and CEO of Hilton Hotels
 Wendi Deng Murdoch – media executive, wife of News Corp Chairman Rupert Murdoch
 Doug Emhoff – entertainment lawyer, Second Gentleman of the United States, husband of Vice President Kamala Harris
 Christine Essel – Senior Vice President, Paramount Pictures
 Jon V. Ferrara - entrepreneur and founder of Nimble
 Dirk Gates – founder and CEO of Xircom and Xirrus
 Gene Haas – NASCAR team owner; Haas F1 Solo owner; Haas Automation president
 Jerry Jordan – former member of President Ronald Reagan's Council of Economic Advisers and former president and chief executive officer of the Federal Reserve Bank of Cleveland
 Rao Machiraju – Executive in Residence and Co-Director of Center for Human Applied Reasoning and the Internet of Things (Chariot) at the University of Southern California, former CEO of ReQall.
 David Nazarian – businessman and philanthropist, founder and CEO of Nîmes Capital
 Charles Noski – CFO of AT&T,  Northrop Grumman Corporation, and Bank of America
 Nick Patsaouras – businessman, engineer, and public official
 Steve Pavlina – self-development professional
 Dan Pena – businessman
 Vicki Roberts – attorney, on-air legal commentator, television and film personality
 Stan Polovets – led the $15bn merge and $55bn sale of TNK-BP, Lead Director on the Board of L1 Energy and Chairman at Edelman
 Ravi Sawhney – industrial designer, founder and CEO of RKS Design
 Amanda Simpson – vice president for Research and Technology at Airbus Americas
 Lee Soo-Man – founder and Chairman of SM Entertainment
 Kathleen Utgoff – economist and Commissioner of the Bureau of Labor Statistics
 Michelle Vicary – executive vice president of programming and network publicity for Crown Media
 Frank K. Wheaton – attorney, sports agent and personal manager
 Alex Yemenidjian – Chairman and CEO of Metro-Goldwyn-Mayer, Inc.

Film and television

 Paula Abdul (attended) – entertainer; singer, dancer, judge for television series American Idol and The X Factor. Winner of multiple MTV Video Music Awards, Grammy Awards, and Emmy Awards
 Ariane Andrew (2005) – wrestler
 David Michael Barrett (1992) – screenwriter and film producer
 Deanne Bray (1989) – actress
 Anna Behlmer - Academy Award nominated sound engineer
Dave Caplan  – television writer and producer
 Charmian Carr - actress
 Joan Chen, BA 1979 – actress, filmmaker
 Morris Chestnut (1987) – film and television actor
 Karin Anna Cheung (1992) – actress
 Kristen Cloke - actress
 Kevin Corcoran (1967) – actor, entertainment producer-director
 Mike Darnell - television executive
 Matt Deitsch – film director and freelance photographer (dropped out)
 Bobby Diamond - actor and attorney
 Richard Dreyfuss (1965) – actor, winner of an Academy Award, a Golden Globe, and a BAFTA
 Jenna Elfman – film and television actress known for Dharma and Greg, Golden Globe winner
 Robert Englund – actor best known for his role as Freddy Krueger
 Shannon Fill – actor, Star Trek: The Next Generation film
 Diane Franklin — film and television actress
 Teri Garr (attended) – film actress, comedian, Academy Award nominee
 Alexandra Grey (2013) – film and television actress, singer
 Don Hahn, BA 1975 – film producer, film director; film producer of Beauty and the Beast, The Lion King, The Hunchback of Notre Dame. Golden Globe winner
 Alyson Hannigan (1992) – actress
 Phil Hartman (1966) – film and television actor, comedian, producer
 Linda Kaye Henning — film and television actress
 Helen Hunt (1981) – film and television actress
 Paul Hunter - film director, screenwriter, and music video director
 Dale Launer - screenwriter
 Lillian Lehman – film and television actor
 Nicole Linkletter – Cycle 5 America's Next Top Model winner
 Eva Longoria – actress
 Cheech Marin – actor, comedian, co-star of Cheech and Chong film and television team
 Austin Matelson (aka Luchasaurus), BA 2008, MA 2010 – professional wrestler
 Eva Mendes - actress
 Charles Martin Smith – actor and director
 Al Mayer Jr.-- 2x Academy Award and Emmy Award winning camera designer
 Jillian Michaels – personal trainer and Biggest Loser coach
 Brian A. Miller - Senior Vice President and General Manager of Cartoon Network Studios. Emmy Award-winning television producer
 David Mullich – game designer and producer
 Arsi Nami – Swedish-Persian actor, singer, songwriter, music therapist and philanthropist
 Robert Newman – actor, Guiding Light
 Harry Northup – actor, Taxi Driver and The Silence of the Lambs; poet, "Red Snow Fence"
 Cubby O'Brien (1955–59) – musician; drummer, original member ("Mouseketeer") of The Mickey Mouse Club
 Utt Panichkul - actor and model
 Donald Petrie - actor and film director
 Chuck Pfarrer – screenwriter, author, former SEAL Team commander
 Eve Plumb (1976) – actress, "Jan" on The Brady Bunch
 Lauren Ridloff — actress, Tony Award nominee
 Robbie Rist – actor and musician, "Cousin Oliver" on The Brady Bunch
 Mark Saul – actor, All That, Grey's Anatomy, The Social Network
 Deborah Lynn Scott – costume designer and set designer
 Jean Bruce Scott – actress
 Scott Shaw (1976) – author, actor, filmmaker
 Lloyd Sherr – voice actor
 Jenny Shimizu - actress and model
 Phil Snyder – voice actor; voice of Disney character Jiminy Cricket; Professor, University of Houston
 James Stanfield – professor and film producer, won the Academy Award for Technical Achievement
 Jeri Taylor – co-creator of Star Trek: Voyager
 Brian J. Terwilliger (1994) – producer/director of One Six Right
 Jennifer Tisdale - actress
 Tim Toyama – playwright, producer
 DJ Trevi – actor, DJ, reality personality, director
 Minoti Vaishnav – singer, screenwriter and producer
 Larry Wilcox – actor
 Debra Winger – film and stage actress

Government and politics

 Richard Alarcon (1971) – former California State Senator and Los Angeles City Council member
 Nicole Avant – 13th United States Ambassador to the Bahamas
 Judy Baca (1964) – artist, civil rights activist, Guggenheim Fellow
 Peter Berlin (lawyer) – criminal defense lawyer
 Christopher Bogdan – retired United States Air Force General
 Katie Eyre Brewer – member of the Oregon House of Representatives from the 29th district
 Kansen Chu – member of the San Jose City Council from the 4th District, member of the California State Assembly from 25th Assembly District
 Lance Clow – member of the Idaho House of Representatives from the 24th District
 Mike Curb (1962) – musician, record company executive, 42nd Lieutenant Governor of California
 Mike Davis (politician)- President Pro Tem, Los Angeles Board of Public Works and former member of the California State Assembly
 Jamshid "Jimmy" Delshad (1958) – Mayor of Beverly Hills
 Tara Flanagan – judge of the Superior Court of the State of California in the County of Alameda
 Katie Hill – former Democratic member of the United States House of Representatives, Representative of California's 25th congressional district
 George J. Hochbrueckner – member of the New York State Assembly, member of the United States House of Representatives for New York's 1st congressional district
 Brent A. Jones (born 1963) – Republican member of the Nevada Assembly.
 Jeanne Kohl-Welles – member of the Washington State Senate and Washington House of Representatives from the 36th legislative district
 Charlotte Laws – author, politician and animal rights advocate
 Ralph Lazo – only known non-spouse, non-Japanese American who voluntarily relocated to a World War II Japanese American internment camp
John Lee – member of the Los Angeles City Council representing the 12th district
 Marc Levine – member of the California State Assembly from the 10th District
 Linda Lingle – former Governor of Hawaii
 Bob Marshall – member of the Virginia House of Delegates from the 13th District
 Nury Martinez – former president of the Los Angeles City Council representing the 6th district
 Esha Momeni – Iranian-American women's rights activist
 Kevin Murray – former California State Assemblyman and Senator
 S. James Otero – U.S. District Court judge
 William Paparian – lawyer and former mayor of Pasadena, California
 Fran Pavley – first Mayor of Agoura Hills, member of the California State Assembly for the 41st District, and member of the California State Senate from the 27th District and 23rd District
 Rick Rollens – former Secretary, California State Senate; autism health and research activist
 Peter W. Schramm – Director of the Center for International Education in the United States Department of Education during the Reagan Administration
 Amanda Simpson – test pilot, former Executive Director of the U.S. Army Office of Energy Initiatives (OEI) and Deputy Assistant Secretary of Defense for Operational Energy (became the first openly transgender female presidential appointee)
 Scott Svonkin – politician
 Bob Thorpe – member of the Arizona House of Representatives from the 6th District
 Kathleen Utgoff – economist and Commissioner of the Bureau of Labor Statistics
 Suzette Martinez Valladares - politician elected to the California Assembly
 Racquel Vasquez - mayor of Lemon Grove, California
 Alex Villanueva – the 33rd Sheriff of Los Angeles County, California
 Lorie Zapf – member of the San Diego City Council for the Sixth District and Second District

Journalism
 Marc Cooper – Journalist and academic
 Jonathan Elias – Primary News Anchor / Reporter WJLA Washington D.C. / Instructor U.S. Army War College (Winner of 3 Peabody's, A DuPont, National Emmy, 30 Regional Emmy Awards)
 Barbara Fairchild - Food journalist and editor-in-chief of Bon Appétit
 Tod Goldberg – author and journalist
 Bill Griffeth (BA 1980) – anchor (Closing Bell) and financial journalist on CNBC
 Bill Handel – KFI morning talk show host, attorney
 Sue Herera (BA 1980) – anchor (Power Lunch) and financial journalist on CNBC
 Robert Hilburn (BA 1961) –  music critic for the Los Angeles Times
 Ron Insana – analyst on CNBC
 Ana Kasparian (2004) – Internet personality, co-host of The Young Turks, professor of journalism
 Ken Lubas – photographer, photojournalist, winner of two Pulitzer Prizes
 Rory Markas – play-by-play announcer for the Los Angeles Angels of Anaheim
 A Martinez – journalist and radio host
 Frank del Olmo – editor, columnist and reporter for the Los Angeles Times, winner of an Emmy Award and Pulitzer Prize for Public Service
 Paul Pringle – winner of a George Polk Award, Worth Bingham Prize, Pulitzer Prize for Public Service, and Pulitzer Prize for Investigative Journalism
 Rip Rense – writer and journalist at the Los Angeles Times
 D. Scott Rogo – writer and journalist
 Anita Sarkeesian (2002) – blogger, media critic
 Barbara Starr - television news journalist
 James Taranto – columnist for the Wall Street Journal

Literature
 Kenneth G. Eade (1977) – author of legal thrillers and spy fiction
 Donald Freed – playwright, novelist, and screenwriter
 David Gerrold – science fiction author and screenwriter
 Andy Luckey – television producer, children's book author and illustrator
 Dale McGowan – author, educator, and philanthropist
 Lawrence M. Schoen (1983) – science fiction author
 Rene Colato Lainez (1989)- Children's book author

Music

 Cristian Amigo – composer, guitarist, and ethnomusicologist
 Mark Balderas (1982) – musician, keyboardist and songwriter with the rock band Human Drama
 Richard Campbell – bass guitarist and vocalist
 Tony Clements - musician and tubist
 Mike Curb (1962) – musician, record company executive
 John Densmore (1962) – musician, former drummer of The Doors
 Daryl Dragon (1960) – "The Captain" of the Grammy Award-winning Captain & Tennille
 Michelle DeYoung – classical vocalist and opera singer
 John Doan — musician
 Mike Elizondo – Grammy Award-winning record producer (Eminem, Alanis Morissette, Pink, Natasha Bedingfield, Twenty One Pilots)
 James Fortune (1996) – musician, gospel singer
 Grant Geissman (1974) – guitarist, session guitarist, composer, recording artist
 Gordon Goodwin – big band composer, arranger, and saxophonist
 Scheila Gonzalez - saxophonist
 Andy Grammer (2007) – singer
 Kalani – musician, percussionist
 Fred Katz – jazz cellist
 Jeannie G. Pool – music producer and composer
 Jim Pons (1961) – musician, bass guitarist and singer for The Leaves, The Turtles, and The Mothers of Invention
 Louis Posen - punk rock music producer and record label founder
 Kentaro Sato – musician, composer
 Maia Sharp – singer, songwriter
 Toshiyuki Shimada (1977) – music director, conductor and professor, Yale Symphony Orchestra, Eastern Connecticut Symphony Orchestra, Yale School of Music
 Sebu Simonian – singer, songwriter, keyboardist, producer, half of the Los Angeles-based indie pop duo Capital Cities
 Leland Sklar – musician, session bassist
 Andy Summers – musician, guitarist with The Police
 Serj Tankian – musician, System of A Down
 Pinar Toprak - composer for film and television
 Carol Vaness – opera singer
 Diane Warren – musician,  music publisher, winner of a Grammy Award, an Emmy Award, and a Golden Globe Award
 Tim Weisberg (1960s) – jazz/rock fusion flautist, composer, producer, vocalist
 Bill Worrell - musician

Radio
 Marc Cohen – radio personality
 Barry Smolin – KPFK radio DJ, musician, teacher

Science

 Jeannine Davis-Kimball (1929–2017), archaeologist
 Scott Horowitz – Space Shuttle astronaut
 Adriana Ocampo - NASA scientist
 Simon Ourian - physician and businessman
 Olympia LePoint – author, professional public speaker and award-winning rocket scientist
 Ann E. Watkins - mathematician
 Luis Falcon - physician, computer scientist and human rights activist

Sports

 Beth Allen – professional golfer
 Jodi Anderson – Olympic track and field athlete
 Judy Blumberg – three-time bronze medalist at the World Figure Skating Championships
 Jeanette Bolden – Olympic track and field athlete
 Sherdrick Bonner (1986) – quarterback for the Arizona Rattlers of the Arena Football League
 Lyman Bostock (1968) – star outfielder for the Minnesota Twins and California Angels
 Marcus Brady (1997) – quarterback for the Montreal Alouettes of the Canadian Football League
 Valerie Brisco-Hooks – Olympic track and field champion
 Alice Brown – Olympic track and field athlete
 Julie Brown – Olympic track and field athlete
 Rex Caldwell – professional golfer
 Markus Carr – professional basketball player
 Lamine Diane - basketball player
 Paul Edmondson – pitcher for the Chicago White Sox
 Michael Efevberha – Nigerian-American professional basketball player
 Robert Fick – catcher and first baseman for the Washington Nationals
 Sean Franklin – professional soccer player; defender for Los Angeles Galaxy
 Florence Griffith Joyner – Olympic track and field champion
 D.J. Hackett – wide receiver for the Carolina Panthers
 Jacqueline Hansen – long distance runner and champion marathoner
 Adam Kennedy – second baseman for the Los Angeles Dodgers
 Bob Kersee – track coach
 Joey Kirk – professional soccer player
 Kathy Kohner-Zuckerman - surfer
 Thor Lee – professional soccer player
 Bruce Lemmerman – professional football player
 Kameron Loe (1999) – pitcher for the Milwaukee Brewers
 Austin Matelson – professional wrestler, currently performing for All Elite Wrestling under the ring name Luchasaurus
 Paul McCracken – NBA and Maccabi Tel Aviv basketball player
 Sandra Myers – Olympic track and field athlete
 Daniel Paladini – professional soccer player
 Mary Perry – Olympic volleyball player and coach
 James Richards – offensive guard for the Las Vegas Posse of the Canadian Football League
 Joe Ryan - professional baseball pitcher and Olympic medalist
 Bob Samuelson – Olympic and professional volleyball player
 Willie Sims – professional soccer player; former forward for New England Revolution
 Pam Spencer – Olympic track and field athlete
 Mia St. John – professional boxer
 Dave Stephens – Olympic track and field athlete
 Michael Takahashi – 7 time All-Star player in the Japan Basketball League
 Jason Thompson – first baseman for the Detroit Tigers, California Angels, Pittsburgh Pirates and Montreal Expos
 Bryan Wagner – NFL football punter
 Kathy Weston – Olympic track and field athlete
 Vic Wilk – professional golfer

Visual arts
 Betty Beaumont – conceptual installation artist, sculptor, and photographer
 Karl Dempwolf – contemporary painter
 John Divola – artist
 Greg Evans – cartoonist, artist
 Mike Mandel – a conceptual artist and photographer, attended San Fernando Valley State College
 Michael C. McMillen - sculptor and installation artist
 Judith Simonian – contemporary painter, public and installation artist

Crime
 Stephen Paddock (1977) - perpetrator of the 2017 Las Vegas shooting that killed 58 and injured over 500

Baseball coaches
 Mike Batesole
 Matt Curtis
 Bill Kernen
 Greg Moore
 Dave Serrano

Basketball coaches
 Bobby Braswell
 Pete Cassidy
 Mark Gottfried
 Jim Harrick
 Trent Johnson
 Reggie Theus

Football coaches
 Dave Baldwin
 Jack Elway
 Rod Humenuik
 Tom Keele
 Leon McLaughlin
 Sam Winningham

Softball coaches
 Tairia Flowers
 Charlotte Morgan

Faculty
 Beatriz Cortez - Artist and Professor of Central American Studies
 James Lawson – Visiting scholar in civil discourse and social change
 Bob McChesney - Jazz trombonist and professor of music
 Aglaia Mortcheva – Animator, voice actress, and professor of art
 Martin Pousson – Novelist, poet, and professor of English
 Donna Sheng – Professor of Physics
 Steven Thachuk – Classical guitarist and professor of music
 Nayereh Tohidi – Professor and former Chair at the Department of Gender & Women Studies
 Ann E. Watkins – Professor of Mathematics
 Maria Elena Zavala – Professor of Biology
 Jeremy Yoder – Professor of Biology

Retired and former faculty

 Kim Victoria Abeles – Guggenheim Fellow and Professor in Drawing, Public Art, and Sculpturing
 Rodolfo Acuna – Chicano studies scholar
 Anthony Arthur - author and educator
 Lucille Ball – American actress and comedian known for I Love Lucy, Assistant Professor in 1979
 Vern Bullough – historian and sexologist
 Hans Burkhardt – Swiss-American artist
 Edmund Snow Carpenter – Associate Professor of Anthropology
 Yreina Cervantez – Professor of Chicano Studies
 Annette Charles - actress and speech professor
 Barbara J. Collins – ecologist
 Lorence G. Collins – geologist
 Todd Compton – historian
 John Daversa – Grammy Award-winning jazz musician and Professor
 James Dickey – visiting lecturer, poet and novelist appointed as the 18th United States Poet Laureate and awarded with a Guggenheim Fellowship and National Book Award for Poetry
 Fritz Faiss – German-American artist
 Lorraine Foster – mathematician, first woman to receive a Ph.D. in mathematics from California Institute of Technology
 Adele Eskeles Gottfried – Professor of Educational Psychology and Director of Research Enhancement of the Michael D. Eisner College of Education
 John Curtis Gowan – Professor of Psychology
 Beverly Grigsby – musicologist and composer
 Sheldon H. Harris – historian
 Bess Lomax Hawes – Associate Professor of Anthropology and head of the Anthropology Department
 Harold Hellenbrand – administrator and scholar
 George Heussenstamm – composer
 Amir Hussain – Associate Professor of Religious Studies
 William Karush – mathematician
 Fred Katz – jazz cellist and composer, and Anthropology Professor
 William M. Kramer – rabbi and Professor of Religious Studies
 Alexis Krasilovsky – Filmmaker and professor of cinema
 Art Kunkin – journalist and founder of the Los Angeles Free Press
 Joe Lewis – Chair at the Department of Art
 Magnhild Lien - mathematician
 Robert Oscar Lopez – Professor of Humanities
 Prakash Chandra Lohani – Professor of Finance and Minister of Finance, Minister of Foreign Affairs, Minister of Agricultural and Livestock Development, and Minister of Labour & Transportation in Nepal
 Gloria Ricci Lothrop – historian
 Sabina Magliocco – Guggenheim and Fulbright Fellow, Professor of Anthropology and Religion
 Elena Marchisotto – mathematician
 Khaled Mattawa – poet
 Leemon McHenry – bioethicist
 Beatrice Medicine – anthropologist
 Mohammed Morsi – engineer and 5th President of Egypt
 Raoul Naroll – Professor of Anthropology
 Julian Nava – diplomat and educator
 Roy Peel - Director of the U.S. Census Bureau
 Ron Purcell - professor of music
 Mohammad Qayoumi – Professor of Engineering Management and Minister of Finance and Chief Adviser on Infrastructure and Technology to the President of Afghanistan
 Daniel Raymer – aerospace design engineer
 Carol Rosenberger - classical pianist
 Velva E. Rudd – Research Fellow in the Department of Biology
 Raul Ruiz – journalist, activist, and professor of Chicano Studies
 Benjamin Saltman – poet and Professor of Literature
 Barry Sautman – Adjunct Assistant Professor
 Saba Soomekh – Professor of Religious Studies
 Ann Stanford – poet and professor of creative writing
 Aurelio de la Vega – Composer-in-residence, educator, Distinguished Professor Emeritus, poet
 Gerald Wilson – jazz composer and educator
 Lewis Yablonsky – sociologist, criminologist, and psychotherapist

Presidents

 Erika D. Beck
 James W. Cleary
 Dianne F. Harrison
 Jolene Koester
 Howard S. McDonald
 Ralph Prator
 Blenda Wilson

References

 
Northridge people